Structural Health Monitoring is a peer-reviewed scientific journal that covers the field of engineering, especially concerning Structural health monitoring. Its editor-in-chief is Fu-Kuo Chang of Stanford University. The journal was established in 2002 and is published by SAGE Publications.

Abstracting and indexing 
The journal is abstracted and indexed in the Science Citation Index Expanded. According to the Journal Citation Reports, its 2013 impact factor is 3.206.

References

External links 
 

SAGE Publishing academic journals
English-language journals
Engineering journals
Publications established in 2002
Bimonthly journals